Horacio Rega Molina (San Nicolás de los Arroyos, Argentina, 1899- Buenos Aires, Argentina, 1957) was an Argentine poet specialized in sonnets, journalist, writer, teacher, and Argentine dramatist. He worked as a literary critic in the newspaper "El Mundo".

The works of his youth produced between 1919 and 1925, show an evident influence of the style of Leopoldo Lugones who sponsors him. His works abound in stories and poems about the Argentine countryside and the Argentine telluric spirit. He was a friend of Roberto Mariani and César Tiempo.

Birth and death
Rega Molina was born in 1899 in San Nicolás de los Arroyos, Argentina.  He died in Buenos Aires on October 24, 1957, alone because of the political passions of the time.

Influences and work
Rega Molina was influenced by the writer Leopoldo Lugones and was a friend of Roberto Mariani and Cesar Tiempo.

His most important works include "The Happy Hour" (1919), "The Poem of the Rain " (1922), "The fragrant tree" (1923), "On the Eve of Good Love" (1925), "drawn from a Window Sunday" (1928), "Blue Map " (1931), "Provincial Oda" (1940), "Sentenced to Death Sonnets" (1940), "Root and Crown" (1943), "Homeland of the Field" (1946), "Sonnets My Blood "(1951), "Collection of Poems" (1954).

Honors and posthumous works
Over the course of his life, Rega Molina won, among other distinctions, the Municipal Poetry Prize in 1925, the Grand National Prize for Poetry in 1951 and the top prize of the PEN Club. In his hometown, the day of his birth (July 10) was declared by municipal ordinance, "the day of nicoleña culture".

In 1994 Plus Ultra released two posthumous books, Odes of Jail and on Horseback and Consecration of the Fire.

References 

1899 births
1957 deaths
20th-century Argentine poets
20th-century Argentine male writers
Argentine male poets
People from San Nicolás de los Arroyos